Mount Assurance is a mountain in New Hampshire, United States. It is close to Enfield and Mascoma Lake. It is possible to hike up the mountain.

The Shaker community in Enfield treated the peak as being sacred.

See also 
 Enfield Shaker Museum

References

External links 
 Photographs taken from Mount Assurance

Mountains of New Hampshire
Mountains of Grafton County, New Hampshire